Isela Blanc is an American politician who served as a member of the Arizona House of Representatives from 2017 to 2021.

Positions
Blanc supported Proposition 205, which would have legalized recreational use of marijuana for those 21 and older.

Elections
 2016 Blanc and Athena Salman defeated incumbent Celeste Plumlee, who'd been appointed following the resignation of Andrew Sherwood, and Michael Martinez in the District 26 Democratic Primary. Blanc and Salman defeated Republican Steven Adkins and Green party candidate Cara Trujillo in the general election.

References

External links
 Biography at Ballotpedia

Women state legislators in Arizona
Democratic Party members of the Arizona House of Representatives
Living people
Year of birth missing (living people)
21st-century American politicians
21st-century American women politicians